Thailand competed at the 2008 Summer Paralympics in Beijing, China.

Medalists

Sports

Archery

|-
|align=left|Sakon Inkaew
|align=left|Men's individual recurve W1/W2
|597
|12
|W 102-89
|W 100-96
|L 99-103
|colspan=3|did not advance
|-
|align=left|Sathien Phimthong
|rowspan=2 align=left|Men's individual recurve standing
|578
|18
|L 89-104
|colspan=5|did not advance
|-
|align=left|Suthi Raksamai
|550
|27
|L 85-104
|colspan=5|did not advance
|-
|align=left|Sakon Inkaew Sathien Phimthong Suthi Raksamai
|align=left|Men's team recurve
|1725
|7
|
|W 185-158
|L 202-206
|colspan=3|did not advance
|}

Athletics

Men's track

Boccia

Judo

Powerlifting

Men

Women

Shooting

Swimming

Men

Table tennis

Wheelchair fencing

Wheelchair tennis

See also
Thailand at the Paralympics
Thailand at the 2008 Summer Olympics

References

External links
Beijing 2008 Paralympic Games Official Site
International Paralympic Committee

Nations at the 2008 Summer Paralympics
2008
Paralympics